Erich Roman Ludvig Jacoby (16 June 1885 in Tallinn, Estonia – 10 December 1941 in Gdynia, Poland) was an Estonian architect of Baltic German descent. From 1905 to 1907 he studied at the Leibniz University of Hannover, in 1913 he graduated from the Riga Technical University. In 1939 he went to Germany.

Jacoby has designed many notable buildings in Tallinn, many of which are influenced by expressionism, art nouveau, and in 1930s — functionalism. Among his notable creations is Villa Jacoby.

Gallery

See also
List of Baltic German architects

References

External links

1885 births
1941 deaths
Art Nouveau architects
Modernist architects
Estonian architects
Architects from Tallinn
Riga Technical University alumni
Baltic-German people